Prime Minister Stefan Löfven tendered his resignation on 10 November 2021, leaving his government in place as a caretaker cabinet until a new Prime Minister is elected by the Riksdag. Government formation talks commenced the following day with Magdalena Andersson, the newly-elected head of the Social Democratic party offering to lead a government. She was formally nominated to form a government by the Speaker of the Riksdag, Andreas Norlén later the same day. It was the third government formation process since the 2018 general election, the first taking a record 144 days before the formation of Löfven's second cabinet. The process took place just ten months ahead of the 2022 general election.

Andersson was elected Prime Minister the first time on 24 November and was expected to have appointed the ministers of her government by 26 November. The same day, however, the government-authored budget was voted down in the Riksdag, with the right-wing opposition's proposal passing instead. This led to the Green Party leaving the government cooperation and Magdalena Andersson resigning as Prime Minister before taking office. She was elected a second time on 29 November and her government was officially formed the day after.

Parliamentary situation 

The table below lists parties' representation in the Riksdag as of the last election in 2018.

In the 2018 Swedish general election, no political group or party won an outright majority, resulting in a hung parliament. The Red-Greens, led by Stefan Löfven's Social Democrats (S) held 144 seats in the Riksdag, while the former centre-right Alliance led by Ulf Kristersson's Moderate Party held 143. The right-wing populist party Sweden Democrats, led by Jimmie Åkesson, came in third. As a result, protracted negotiations were required before a new government could be formed. On 18 January 2019, Löfven was re-elected as prime minister thanks to the Centre Party and Liberals (with passive support from the Left Party) on the condition that Löfven's government enact reforms stipulated in the January Agreement between the two liberal parties and the Social Democrats.

Formation talks 
The leader of the Opposition, Moderate leader Ulf Kristersson does not find a right-wing government led by himself feasible, but his party will vote against a Social Democratic-led government. As will the Christian Democrats and the Sweden Democrats.

A recent change in policy within the Liberals to support only a right-wing government alternative, even one that relies on the support of the Sweden Democrats, rules out the possibility of Liberal support for Andersson. The only possibilities for cooperation for the Social Democrats and Greens lie with the Centre and Left parties. Support from both parties would be required in order to elect Andersson and pass a budget.

Annie Lööf, the leader of the Centre Party, has already expressed her party's willingness to tolerate a government led by Andersson.

Nooshi Dadgostar of the Left Party has demanded negotiations regarding increased pensions before tolerating an Andersson-led government. While talks with the Left are on-going, media speculations suggest that the Social Democrats might not be able to appease both the socialist Left and the liberal Centre Party's demands without losing the support of either.

On 22 November, Norlén officially nominated Andersson as prime minister, with a confirmation vote scheduled for two days later.
On the evening of 23 November, the day before the vote on Andersson, the intended coalition parties of an Andersson-led government Social Democrats and Green Party struck a deal with the Left Party to increase the lower limit of the guaranteed pension for the unemployed. The new rules are expected to start in September 2022, if the proposal is approved by the Riksdag. The deal also resulted in a statement that the Left Party will act confidence and supply to the potential new government and support their budget.

First Riksdag vote 
In the Riksdag, as long as the Speaker's proposal for a new prime minister is not opposed by half of its members, the proposal is carried. Andersson was elected with only a slim minority voting against her (174 'no' votes out of 349 members). This makes her the first female prime minister in Swedish history. One member of the Riksdag from the Left Party was absent during the vote.

Budget vote 
Following the agreement between the Left Party and Andersson, the Centre Party announced that they would not be supporting the government's budget proposal at the budget vote on 24 November. As expected, the government-authored budget proposal was voted down in the Riksdag. The 2022 budget will be based on the joint proposal of the right-wing opposition parties; the Moderates, Sweden Democrats and the Christian Democrats. Andersson has stated that she would be willing to govern despite an Opposition-authored budget. Unwilling to help implement policy negotiated by the Sweden Democrats, the Green Party announced that they would leave the government cooperation shortly after the budget vote. With the Greens no longer a part of Andersson's proposed coalition, a new vote to elect a Prime Minister would likely have to be held.

The Opposition's budget proposal is a modified version of the government's that includes lower taxes for working people and retirees, lower fuel taxes, increased salaries for police employees and the cutting of the government's proposed funding for a family week, forest protection and housing subsidies.

Andersson's resignation 
After losing the support of the Green Party in government, Andersson asked to resign her post as Prime Minister, just seven hours after being elected and before taking office. Stefan Löfven will remain in office until a replacement can take office.

On the evening of 24 November, the Green Party, the Left Party and the Centre Party have all publicly said they will abstain from voting against a single-party Andersson cabinet, in a potential upcoming vote in the Riksdag. Together with the support of independent parliament member Amineh Kakabaveh, Andersson was re-elected Prime Minister. A proposal is approved as long as less than half of the parliament members vote against it.

Second Riksdag vote 
Andersson was finally elected on 29 November with 101 voting yes, 75 abstaining and 173 voting no; of the 349 total.

Formation process

Election of Prime Minister 
The Swedish constitution creates a system known as "negative parliamentarianism", wherein "a prime ministerial candidate does not need to have the support of a majority, they only need to show that they do not have a majority of parliament (175 members) against them." In other words, the vote of confidence in Sweden is in practice a vote of no confidence, wherein the burden of proof is on the opposition. Political parties can symbolically "abstain" from the vote, which in practice acts as a yes vote and shows that the party tolerates, or tacitly approves, a government formation without the obligations that come with outright support. Thus, the status quo is to seek a government agreement that is tolerable by a majority of the parties, rather than a polarizing agreement that is liked by one side and hated by the other.

Speaker Andreas Norlén has given Magdalena Andersson the sonderingsuppdrag, which effectively means that she is tasked with examining the possibility of forming a government led by herself. She is given a one-week (extendable) deadline to return with a result. If viable, the Speaker may then opt to formally nominate her as the prime ministerial candidate and a vote in the Riksdag will commence. If Andersson is unable to form a government, the Speaker may give the task to another Member of Parliament (the norm is to pick one of the party leaders). The Speaker may propose four Prime Ministerial candidates before a mandatory snap election is called.

Budget vote 
In conjunction with the government formation process, the state budget for 2022 is set to be decided on by the Riksdag. During a budget vote, the budget proposals with the least amount of expected support are put forward against the budget of the government, if both fail, the government's budget will be put up against the budget with the greatest support, in this case the proposal of the Opposition. Negative parliamentarism is not applied in this case, a simple majority is sufficient for a budget proposal to pass. Until 2014, the norm has been to abstain at the vote of the final proposal, but this practice has fallen out of use, since.

See also 

 2021 Swedish government crisis

References 

Cabinet formation
Sweden 2021
2021 in Sweden
2021 in politics